Fertile Valley may refer to:

Rural Municipality of Fertile Valley No. 285, Saskatchewan, Canada
Fertile Valley No. 429, Alberta, Canada; a former municipal district, now part of Ponoka County

See also

The Idlers of the Fertile Valley, a 1978 Greek film
Rural Municipality of Fertile Belt No. 183, Saskatchewan, Canada
Soil fertility#Global distribution, regions of fertile soil across the world